Khitan Small Script is a Unicode block containing characters from the Khitan small script, which was used for writing the Khitan language spoken by the Khitan people in northern China during the Liao dynasty.

Khitan Small Script characters do not have descriptive character names, but have names derived algorithmically from their code point value (e.g. U+18B00 is named KHITAN SMALL SCRIPT CHARACTER-18B00).

Block

History
The following Unicode-related documents record the purpose and process of defining specific characters in the Khitan Small Script block:

See also 
 Ideographic Symbols and Punctuation (Unicode block)

References 

Unicode blocks
Khitan scripts